Włodzimierz Zawadzki (10 May 1911 – 5 May 1996) was a Polish rower. He competed in the men's coxed four at the 1936 Summer Olympics.

References

1911 births
1996 deaths
Sportspeople from Vilnius
People from Vilensky Uyezd
People from the Russian Empire of Polish descent
Polish male rowers
Olympic rowers of Poland
Rowers at the 1936 Summer Olympics